Okachickima Creek is a stream in the U.S. state of Mississippi.

Okachickima is a name derived from the Choctaw language meaning "good water".

References

Rivers of Mississippi
Rivers of Yalobusha County, Mississippi
Mississippi placenames of Native American origin